Tigercat was a 1960s catamaran sailboat of the Eastern Multihull Sailing Association. In 1961 it was defeated by John Fisk sailing Hellcats II of the Clapham Sands Sailing Club four races to one.

See also
List of multihulls
Trimaran

References

Individual catamarans
1960s ships
1960s sailing yachts